Accord is a political party in Nigeria. In the 2015 National Assembly of Nigeria election, the party won 1 seat in the House of Representatives (Dauda Kako Abayomi Are from Mushin I constituency) and 0 out of 109 seats in the Senate.

References

Political parties in Nigeria
Political parties with year of establishment missing